Aphanocapsa is a genus of cyanobacteria belonging to the family Merismopediaceae.

The species of this genus are found in Europe, Asia (Bangladesh) and America.

Species:

Aphanocapsa elachista 
Aphanocapsa feldmannii

References

Synechococcales
Cyanobacteria genera